Prawn is a common name for small aquatic crustaceans with an exoskeleton and ten legs (members of the order of decapods), some of which are edible.

The term prawn is used particularly in the United Kingdom, Ireland, and Commonwealth nations, for large swimming crustaceans or shrimp, especially those with commercial significance in the fishing industry. Shrimp in this category often belong to the suborder Dendrobranchiata. In North America, the term is used less frequently, typically for freshwater shrimp. The terms shrimp and prawn themselves lack scientific standing. Over the years, the way they are used has changed, and in contemporary usage, the terms are almost interchangeable.

Shrimp vs. prawn

Regional distinctions
The terms shrimp and prawn originated in Britain. In the use of common names for species, shrimp is applied to smaller species, particularly species that are dorsoventrally depressed (wider than deep) with a shorter rostrum. It is the only term used for species in the family Crangonidae, such as the common shrimp or brown shrimp, Crangon crangon. Prawn is never applied to very small species. It is applied to most of the larger forms, particularly species that are laterally compressed (deeper than wide) and have a long rostrum. However, the terms are not used consistently. For example, some authors refer to Pandalus montagui as an Aesop shrimp, while others refer to it as an Aesop prawn.

Commonwealth countries, and Ireland, tend to follow British usage. Some exceptions occur in Australia, where some authors refer to small species of the Palaemonidae as prawns and call the Alpheidae pistol shrimp. Other Australian authors have given the name banded coral shrimp to the prawn-like Stenopus hispidus and listed "the Processidae and Atyidae as shrimps, the Hippolytidae, Alpheidae, Pandalidae and Campylonotoidea as prawns". New Zealand broadly follows British usage. A rule of thumb given by some New Zealand authors states: "In common usage, shrimp are small, some three inches or less in length, taken for food by netting, usually from shallow water. Prawn are larger, up to 12 inches long, taken by trapping and trawling." In Canada, the terms are often used interchangeably as in New Zealand (larger species are prawns, and smaller are often shrimp), but regional variations exist. In western provinces, prawn is almost exclusively the general term.  South Africa and the former British colonies in Asia also seem to follow British usage generally.

Shrimp is the more general term in the United States. The term prawn is less commonly used in the United States, being applied mainly to larger shrimp and those living in freshwater.

References

Further reading

 Bauer, Raymond T. 2004 "Remarkable Shrimps: Adaptations and Natural History of the Carideans" University of Oklahoma Press. .
 De Grave, S., Cai, Y. & Anker, A. (2008) "Global diversity of shrimps (Crustacea: Decapoda: Caridea) in freshwater" Hydrobiologia, 595 : 287–293. 
 
 Fransen, C. H. J. M. & De Grave, S. (2009) "Evolution and radiation of shrimp-like decapods: an overview" In: Martin J.W., Crandall K.A., Felder D.L. (eds.), Decapod Crustacean Phylogenetics. CRC Press, pp. 246–259.
 Holthuis, L. B. (1980) Shrimps and prawns of the world Volume I of the FAO species catalogue, Fisheries synopsis 125, Rome. .
 Kaplan, Eugene H. (2010) Sensuous Seas: Tales of a Marine Biologist Princeton University Press. .
 Meyer, R., Lochner, S. & Melzer, R. R. (2009) Decapoda – Crabs, Shrimps & Lobsters  pp. 623–670 In: Häussermann, V. and Förster, G. (eds) Marine Benthic Fauna of Chilean Patagonia: Illustrated Identification Guide, Nature in Focus. .
 Poore, Gary (2004) [https://books.google.com/books?id=ZZWnuGc0xlMC Marine Decapod Crustacea of Southern Australia: A Guide to Identification] Csiro Publishing. .
 Fearnley-Whittingstall, H. & Fisher, N. (2007) The River Cottage Fish Book Page 541–543, Bloomsbury Publishing. .
 Roberts, Callum (2009) The unnatural history of the sea Island Press. .
 Rudloe, Jack and Rudloe, Anne (2009) Shrimp: The Endless Quest for Pink Gold FT Press. .
 Ruppert, E. E., Fox, R. S. & Barnes, R. D. (2004)  Invertebrate zoology: A functional evolutionary approach 7th edition, Thomson-Brooks/Cole. .

External links

 Shrimp versus prawn shrimp, lobster, crab ngrams
  Shrimp versus prawns – YouTube

Animal-based seafood
Commercial crustaceans
Decapods
Edible crustaceans
Arthropod common names